Fabio Francesco Grossi (born 3 September 1967, in Milan) is a retired Italian sprinter who specialized in the 400 metres.

Biography
Fabio Grossi won three medals at the International athletics competitions, two of these with national relays team.  His personal best time is 45.92 seconds, achieved in September 1994 in Bologna. He participated at one edition of the Summer Olympics (1992), he has 21 caps in national team from 1989 to 1996.

Achievements

National titles
He has won 1 time the individual national championship.
1 win in the 400 metres indoor (1993)

See also
 Italy national relay team

References

External links
 

1967 births
Living people
Italian male sprinters
Athletes (track and field) at the 1992 Summer Olympics
Olympic athletes of Italy
Athletes from Milan
Mediterranean Games gold medalists for Italy
Mediterranean Games silver medalists for Italy
Athletes (track and field) at the 1991 Mediterranean Games
World Athletics Championships athletes for Italy
Mediterranean Games medalists in athletics
World Athletics Indoor Championships medalists
20th-century Italian people